Universal Stars is a Ghanaian professional football team that plays in the 1B Zone of the Ghana Division One League.

References

Football clubs in Ghana